Failure to communicate may refer to:

"What we've got here is failure to communicate", a line from the 1967 film Cool Hand Luke
"Failure to Communicate," an episode of the television series House
"A Failure to Communicate" is the fourth episode of the sixth season of the television series Oz